Ardsley is a small village approximately  east from Barnsley and forms part of the Metropolitan Borough of Barnsley of South Yorkshire, England. The village is in the Stairfoot ward of Barnsley Metropolitan Council. It is historically part of the West Riding of Yorkshire. The A635 (or Doncaster Road) divides the village into two parts.

The Ardsley House Hotel was one of the key features of the village, however the hotel entered administration in March 2014 and subsequently closed down in July 2014. There is a small primary school, named Oakhill Primary Academy (previously named Ardsley Oaks Junior School and then Oakhill Primary School), and an Anglican church (Christ Church).

Sport
Two football teams from the village have played in the FA Cup: Ardsley F.C. and Ardsley Athletic F.C.

References

External links

 Oakhill Primary School
 Ardsley Residents Association (http://ardsleyresidents.com/index.html)

Villages in South Yorkshire
Geography of Barnsley